Milenko Zorić (born 2 April 1989) is a Serbian sprint canoer.

Biography
At the 2016 Summer Olympics, he won with Marko Tomićević a silver team medal in the men's K-2 1000 m event.  He also competed in the K-4 1000 m in Rio.  At the 2012 Summer Olympics, he competed in the K-4 1000 m only.

He won a bronze medal in the K-2 1000 m event at the 2015 ICF Canoe Sprint World Championships in Milan with Tomićević.

He and Tomićević won silver 2017 European Sprint Canoe Championships and bronze at the 2016 European Sprint Canoe Championships.  He won a bronze medal in the K-4 1000 m event at the 2012 Canoe Sprint European Championships in Zagreb.  

He took up canoeing in 1999.

References

EC bronze medal
ICF WS bronze medal

1989 births
Living people
People from Sanski Most
Serbian male canoeists
Olympic canoeists of Serbia
Canoeists at the 2012 Summer Olympics
Canoeists at the 2016 Summer Olympics
Serbs of Bosnia and Herzegovina
Olympic silver medalists for Serbia
Olympic medalists in canoeing
Medalists at the 2016 Summer Olympics
European Games competitors for Serbia
ICF Canoe Sprint World Championships medalists in kayak
Canoeists at the 2015 European Games
Canoeists at the 2019 European Games
Competitors at the 2013 Mediterranean Games
Mediterranean Games competitors for Serbia
European champions for Serbia